Philip Morris (1835–1873) was a British tobacconist and cigarette importer whose name was later used for Philip Morris & Co. Ltd. established in New York City in 1902.

Life and career
In 1847, Philip Morris's family opened a tobacco shop on Bond Street in London, where he sold loose tobacco and pre-rolled cigarettes. By 1854, he had started making his own cigarettes. In 1870, Morris began to produce Philip Morris Cambridge and Philip Morris Oxford Blues (later called Oxford Ovals and Philip Morris Blues).

Morris died in 1873 while his widow Margaret and brother Leopold Morris carried on his cigarette trade.

References

External links
Philip Morris International

Tobacco in the United States
1873 deaths
Philip Morris USA
1835 births
British company founders
British people of German descent
19th-century British businesspeople